Ugovec is a settlement in the Municipality of Oplotnica in eastern Slovenia. The area is part of the traditional region of Styria. The municipality is now included in the Drava Statistical Region.

A small chapel in the settlement is a small Neo-Renaissance building with a wooden belfry. It was built in 1933.

References

External links
Ugovec on Geopedia

Populated places in the Municipality of Oplotnica